Xenochlorodes is a genus of moths in the family Geometridae.

Species
Xenochlorodes gilvescens
Xenochlorodes magna
Xenochlorodes nubigena
Xenochlorodes olympiaria

References

Natural History Museum Lepidoptera genus database

Geometrinae
Geometridae genera